Vadacurry is a 2014 Indian Tamil-language comedy thriller film written and directed by debutant Saravana Rajan. The film stars Jai and Swathi Reddy and was produced by Dayanidhi Azhagiri's Meeka Entertainment. The film has cinematography by Venkatesh and the technical crew includes editing by Praveen K. L. and N. B. Srikanth and art direction by Ramalingam, while the costumes were being designed by Anusha Dayanidhi. The film started filming on 19 August 2013, and was released on 19 June 2014.

Plot

Sathish (Jai), is a newly appointed medical representative who is basically a family man living with his brother (Aruldoss), an auto rickshaw driver. Sathish is always embarrassed about his mobile phone, and much to his delight, he picks up a phone which is left carelessly by its owner at a tea shop. The mobile phone gets him into trouble, and his carefree life with his girlfriend Naveena (Swathi Reddy) turns upside-down.

Cast 

 Jai as Sathish
 Swathi Reddy as Naveena
 RJ Balaji as Karikalan aka Vadacurry 
 Aruldoss as Sathish's brother
 Kasthuri as Sathish's sister-in-law
 Misha Ghoshal as Naveena's friend
 Ajay Raj as Dhayalan
 Sai Prashanth as Ravishankar
 Ramachandran Durairaj
 Mippu
 Tiger Garden Thangadurai
 Venkat Prabhu (Special appearance)
 Premgi Amaren (Cameo appearance)
 Mahat Raghavendra (Cameo appearance)
 Sunny Leone as an item number "Low Aana Life u"

Production 

Dayanidhi Azhagiri's Meeka Entertainment announced its next production venture in July 2013 to be directed by debutant Saravana Rajan, a former associate of director Venkat Prabhu. The film was titled Vadacurry, a famous South Indian gravy/curry. Jai and Swati Reddy were selected to play the lead, coming together after Subramaniapuram. Though it was initially reported that Anirudh Ravichander would compose the music for the film, the producer confirmed in September 2013 that Yuvan Shankar Raja was signed on. However despite composing one song for the film, Yuvan's busy schedule meant that he unable to complete his commitments and was replaced by newcomer duo Vivek Shiva and Mervin Solomon, who had been recommended by Anirudh. Sunny Leone was signed on by Azhagiri for a special appearance in a song, making her Tamil debut with this film.

The filming began on 19 August 2013. A pooja was held with director Vetrimaaran and Kasthuri in attendance. The first look poster was unveiled on 23 August 2013. The first schedule of shooting was completed on 3 September 2013.

Soundtrack

The film's soundtrack was composed by newcomer duo Vivek-Mervin, while Yuvan Shankar Raja composed one song "Uyirin Maeloru Uyirvandhu" for the film. The songs were met with a positive response from critics. The album marked the Tamil debut of Diwakar. The duo later composed two more songs, which featured in the film but not in the soundtrack.

Release
The satellite rights of the film were sold to Zee Thamizh  The film  was released on 19 June 2014 by Varun Manian's Radiance Media, ahead of three other Tamil films.

Critical reception 
Baradwaj Rangan wrote, "In the Venkat Prabhu universe, plot comes last, the jokes first. And this is where Saravana Rajan scores. Forget the fact that you’re watching a real movie and slip into “skit” mode — and you may find yourself possessed by the film’s spirit, thanks mainly to RJ Balaji". The Times of India gave the film 3 stars out of 5 and wrote, "Director Saravana Rajan coasts through the first half with the motormouth RJ Balaji, whose kitchen sink brand of comedy results in many laughs and quite a few misses. And, yet, despite the flair, the film feels uneven and the strain to maintain a lighthearted tone makes one think that nothing is really at stake here. The plot could have made into a great black comedy, a satire on our materialistic lifestyle, but there is hardly any sting here". Deccan Chronicle gave it 2.5 stars and called the film "fairly engaging", writing that, "although good in parts, numerous scenes can peter out, mostly due to the super thin story and plot. The laughs in the first half were generously distributed, making it a relative breeze for the viewing audience. But one finds hardly any chemistry between the lovers on screen, and the second half can thus fizzle out due to lack of depth, which the laughs alone cannot compensate for". Hindustan Times wrote, "Vadacurry is stretchy and the story jumps lanes and badgers us with its convoluted contours. What could have been a stinging black comedy, a smarting satire on greed and profiteering ends up as a mishmash".

The New Indian Express wrote, "Between the positives and the negatives, the positives largely outweigh the negatives here. A commendable effort from a debutant maker to strike away from the routine formula scenario, Vadacurry is a fairly engaging watch". Indo-Asian News Service gave it 3 stars out of 5 and wrote, "Vadacurry has a promising story, one that connects with you instantly, but it needed powerful performances to be an edge-of-the-seat-thriller, which surely was missing. Despite...shortcomings, Saravana keeps audiences hooked with his story that dishes out all the necessary elements of a commercial entertainer...the end product is not exceptional, but satisfying". Sify wrote, "Vadacurry is light and easy, enjoyable for the most part and is packed with delicious little scenes and moments that will have you chuckling, the moment you settle into your seat. Debutant Saravana Rajan, coming from Venkat Prabhu school of filmmaking has made a fun film, with right mix of entertainment elements". S. Saraswathi of Rediff gave the film 3 out of 5, calling it "a commendable effort by the director and definitely worth a watch". Behindwoods gave the film 2.75 out of 5 and stated, "Vadacurry has a lot of fun elements on offer", calling it "a spicy entertainer pulled out of a normal story". Oneindia praised the movie for what it called a "high engagement rate". Indiaglitz in its review said, "Debutante director Saravanan Rajan has packaged a wafer thin story with equal share of comedy, romance, sentiment and suspense".

References

External links
 

2014 films
2010s Tamil-language films
2010s comedy thriller films
Indian comedy thriller films
2014 directorial debut films
2014 comedy films